Dufau is a French surname. Notable people with the surname include:

André Dufau (1905–1990), French sprinter
Clémentine-Hélène Dufau (1869–1937), French artist
Jean-Pierre Dufau (born 1943), French politician
Jenny Dufau (1878–1924), French opera singer
Julien Dufau (1888–1916), French rugby union player
Loïc Dufau (born 1989), French footballer
Pierre Dufau (1908–1985), French architect

French-language surnames